George Newland Osborn (18 December 1850 – 3 March 1913) was an English first-class cricketer active in 1881 who played for Middlesex. He was born in Havering Atte Bower, Essex; died in Westminster.

References

1850 births
1913 deaths
English cricketers
Middlesex cricketers